The Cercle Gaulois, in full the Cercle Royal Gaulois Artistique et Littéraire, is a Belgian male-only club in Brussels that promotes art. The club has the aim of constituting a friendly, intellectual, artistic and literary meeting place, free of any political, cultural or philosophical tendency. Its current president is Geoffroy Generet.

The club is located at 5 rue de la Loi in the historic Vauxhall building in Brussels Park, behind the Royal Park Theatre.

History
The Cercle Royal Artistique et Littéraire ("Artistic and Literary Royal Circle") was founded in Brussels on 23 November 1848. The Cercle de la Toison d’Or ("Circle of the Golden Fleece") was founded in Brussels on 23 December 1911, and its name was changed to the Cercle Gaulois ("Gallic Circle") on 13 June 1919. The Cercle Gaulois became the Cercle Royal Gaulois ("Gallic Royal Circle") by authorization of His Majesty King Leopold III of Belgium on 16 February 1937. In 1950, the Cercle Royal Gaulois merged with the Cercle Royal Artistique et Littéraire and changed its name to the Cercle Royal Gaulois Artistique et Littéraire.

Functions
Today, the club serves many purposes. It organises concerts, exhibitions and conferences in which all forms of art are represented, including culinary art. Following a tradition that dates back to 1971, every Tuesday evening, a club member is appointed master of fine dining. This member creates a menu together with a head chef and presents it to the guests. At the end of the meal, this member is appraised.

Notable members
 Étienne Davignon
 Armand Dedecker
 Albert Frère
 Derrick Gosselin
 Pierre Harmel
 Tony Mary
 Gérard Mestrallet
 Diego du Monceau de Bergendal
 Michel Tilmant
 Karel Van Miert (died in 2009)
 Alain Siaens
 André Antoine
 Paul Buysse
 Mark Eyskens

See also
 Cercle Royal du Parc
 Cercle de Lorraine
 De Warande
 Federation of Belgian Enterprises
 Olivaint Conference of Belgium
 University Foundation

Sources
 Remarks by Ambassador Korologos at the Cercle Royal Gaulois Luncheon Thursday, March 17, 2005
 Assemblée générale de la Société de la Légion d’Honneur - 15 novembre 2006
 Jan Puype, De elite van België - Welkom in de club, Van Halewyck

References

External links

 

Gentlemen's clubs in Belgium
1848 establishments in Belgium